The Farmers' Produce Trade and Commerce (Promotion and Facilitation) Act, 2020 was an act of the Indian Government  that permits intra-state and inter-state trade of farmers’ produce beyond the physical premises of Agricultural Produce Market Committee (APMC) market yards (mandis) and other markets notified under state APMC Acts.

The Act was collectively passed as part of the 2020 Farm Bills.

The Government of India has transferred the money for the wheat procured by the Food Corporation of India (FCI) in April, 2021, directly to the Bank Accounts of Farmers - an amount of Rs 13.71 crore benefiting around 1.6 lakh farmers in Punjab has been transferred online.

Agricultural reform
 The essential commodities Act 1955 amended. 
 The Act of 1955 has been amended to help both farmers and consumers while bringing in price stability.  The following benefits are expected from this reform move.
 Commodities like cereals, pulses, oilseeds, edible oil, onion and potatoes will be removed from list of essential commodities
 Freedom to produce, hold, move, distribute and supply
 It will help drive up investment. 
 In situations such as war, famine, extraordinary price rise and natural calamity, such agricultural foodstuff can be regulated. 
 Barrier free trade. Like The farming produce trade and commerce (promotion and  facilitation) Act 2020 (status of the Act is Halted) 
 Freedom to engage with buyers. Like Farmer(empowerment and protection) agreement on price assurance and farm services Act 2020.

Farmers (Empowerment and Protection) Agreement on Price Assurance and Farm Services Act
This Act, along with the Farmers (Empowerment and Protection) Agreement on Price Assurance and Farm Services Act, was promulgated by the Union Cabinet on 5 June 2020. The Lok Sabha approved the bills on 17 September 2020, and Rajya Sabha on 20 September 2020.

Provisions 
Prior to the 2020 legislation, agricultural trade in India could only be conducted in APMC market yards (mandis). This Act, however, also allows trading in "outside trade areas"—such as farm gates, factory premises, warehouses, silos, and cold storages—and prohibits state governments from levying any market fee or cess on farmers, traders; it also aims to provide electronic-trading platforms for trading the produce of farmers in such areas.

The Act seeks to facilitate lucrative prices for farmers through competitive alternative trading channels to promote barrier-free inter-state and intra-state trade of agriculture goods. It also permits the electronic trading of farmers' produce in the specified trade area, facilitating direct and online buying & selling of such products through electronic devices and internet.

Criticism
The Act bypasses the Agricultural Produce Market Committee altogether, creating a separate structure of trading. Before the Act, state governments levied taxes for agricultural produce that was bought outside the designated APMC mandi; this Act prohibits this and creates an incentive for buyers to purchase products outside the regulated APMC mandi.

The new Bills give the impression that farmers had unnecessary restrictions to trade freely for agricultural products, and mandis were the designated space for all transactions. Accordingly, the amendment of the APMC Act, and the ensuing political uproar, are mostly significant for farmers in Punjab and Haryana, where mandis are the central place of transaction. In contrast, NSSO data from a 2012–13 "situation assessment survey" of farmers reveals that most households in India sell off their crops through private traders or input dealers, rather than mandis or cooperatives.

Dilip Mohite Patil, who is the president of the Maharashtra Rajya Bazaar Samiti Sahakari Sangh, a federation of Maharashtra's 306 APMCs, claimed that around 100-125 market committees in the Vidarbha and Marathwada regions have reported almost no business and are on the verge of closure after the central ordinance was announced.

Food Processing Industries Minister Harsimrat Kaur Badal of Shiromani Akali Dal resigned from her post in protest against the bills. Farmers all over the country have held protests against the bills.

See also
 Agricultural produce market committee
 Ministry of Agriculture & Farmers' Welfare
 Farmers (Empowerment and Protection) Agreement on Price Assurance and Farm Services Act, 2020
Agricultural marketing
Farmer’s Produce Trade and Commerce Act, 2020 Rules

References

External links
 

Agricultural marketing in India
Acts of the Parliament of India 2020